Nothing Is Impossible may refer to:

"Nothing is Impossible", a song by Westlife from Coast to Coast
Nothing Is Impossible (Planetshakers album), 2011 album by Planetshakers
Nothing Is Impossible (Planetshakers song)
Nothing Is Impossible (Planetshakers Kids album), 2013 album by Planetshakers Church
14 Peaks: Nothing Is Impossible, 2021 documentary film

See also
Impossible is nothing (disambiguation)
Nada es Imposible (disambiguation)